= Pia Rumler-Detzel =

German lawyer (born 1934)

Pia Eleonore Rumler-Detzel (11 July 1934 – 18 April 2026) was a German lawyer. In 1988, she became a member of the Federal Party Court of the CDU. In December 2004, she was elected as the first woman chair. She was the chairman of the medical confiscation senate at the Higher Regional Court of Cologne until her retirement.
